The Television Act 1954 was a British law which permitted the creation of the first commercial television network in the United Kingdom, ITV.

Until the early 1950s, the only television service in Britain was operated as a monopoly by the British Broadcasting Corporation, and financed by the annual television licence fee payable by each household which contained one or more television sets. The new Conservative government elected in 1951 wanted to create a commercial television channel, but this was a controversial subject—the only other examples of commercial television were to be found in the United States, and it was widely considered that the commercial television found there was "vulgar".

The solution to the problem was to create the Independent Television Authority which would closely regulate the new commercial channel in the interests of good taste, and award franchises to commercial companies for fixed terms. Aware that TV coverage of the Coronation of Queen Elizabeth II in the U.S. had been interrupted by advertisements, one of which featured celebrity chimpanzee J. Fred Muggs, a clause was included in the Act banning advertising breaks during broadcasts featuring the royal family.

The first commercial franchises were awarded in 1954, and commercial television started broadcasting in stages between 1955 and 1962. The first advertisement aired by ITV promoted Gibbs SR toothpaste at 20.12hrs local time on 22 September 1955. Household cleaners were the most frequently advertised products over the 1955–1960 period.

References

United Kingdom Acts of Parliament 1954
ITV (TV network)
1954 in British television
Media legislation
BBC
History of television in the United Kingdom